Mabul is a small island off the southeastern coast of Sabah in Malaysia. The island has been a fishing village since the 1970s. After the 1990s, Mabul gained popularity with scuba divers due to its proximity to Sipadan island.

Located 15 kilometres from Sipadan, the island is roughly 0.2 square kilometers in size and around 2-3 meters above sea level. It is located on the northwest corner of a large reef nearly two kilometers long.

Mabul island is administered as a part of Semporna, Tawau district.

Native settlements 
The two main settlements on the island are Kampung Mabul and Kampung Musu. The 1999 census recorded approximately 2,000 villagers living in Mabul, half of them children under 14 years old. The majority are immigrants from relatively nearby clusters of islands in the southern Philippines. These residents are mainly Bajau Laut and Suluk Muslims who live a nomadic lifestyle.

Basic amenities include a mosque, schools, community and fishermen's hall. The main transportation mode between places is via boat.

As most residents mainly work as fishermen, the village's source of income depends on ocean-based products such as squid and fish. Traditional fishing methods are called "Payau" and "Sangkaliya". Mabul fishers prefer fishing close to the Malaysia–Philippine borders, perhaps due to the abundance of fish stocks. An average fishing trip will take 3 to 5 days out at sea. When the men return, their catches are sold at Semporna on the mainland.

As of 2020, the population of Mabul is around 2000.

Sea life and the reef 

Mabul's reef is on the edge of the continental shelf and the seabed surrounding the reef slopes out to a depth of 25 to 30 m. 

Flamboyant cuttlefish, blue-ringed octopus, mimic octopus and bobtail squids are common cephalopods found in the Mabul reef. Frogfish are prevalent; giant, painted and clown frogfish are regularly seen along with most of the scorpion fish family.

See also
 List of islands of Malaysia

References

Islands of Sabah